Utraula is a constituency of the Uttar Pradesh Legislative Assembly covering the city of Utraula in the Balrampur district of Uttar Pradesh, India.

Utraula is one of five assembly constituencies in the Gonda Lok Sabha constituency. Since 2008, this assembly constituency is numbered 293 amongst 403 constituencies.

Currently this seat belongs to Bharatiya Janta Party candidate Ram Pratap alias Shashikant Verma who won in last Assembly election of 2017 Uttar Pradesh Legislative Elections defeating Samajwadi Party candidate Arif Anwar Hashmi by a margin of 29,174 votes.

Election results

2022

References

External links
 

Assembly constituencies of Uttar Pradesh
Balrampur district, Uttar Pradesh